Grippe is another name for influenza, an infectious disease.

Grippe may also refer to:

Grippe (album), by Jawbox, 1991
Grippe, West Virginia, US
Peter Grippe (1912–2002), American artist
Jacqueline Laurita (née Grippe; born 1970), American television personality

See also

 
 
 Grip (disambiguation)
 Influenza (disambiguation)
 Flu (disambiguation)